Kenton Showcase refers to two 10-inch LPs by bandleader Stan Kenton recorded in early 1954 on Capitol, one each featuring compositions by Bill Holman and Bill Russo. These albums were combined as a 12-inch LP in 1955.

Critical reception

The Allmusic review by Scott Yanow states "It's a fine showcase for the two talented writers".

Track listing
All compositions by Bill Russo (tracks 1-8) or Bill Holman (tracks 9-17 & 20) unless noted.
 "A Theme of Four Values" - 2:51	
 "A Study for Bass" - 3:34
 "Blues Before and After" - 2:01
 "Bacante" - 4:20
 "Thisbe" - 2:49
 "Egdon Heath" - 3:09
 "Sweets" - 2:35
 "Dusk" - 3:21
 "Bags" - 3:05
 "Hav-a-Havana" - 2:52
 "Solo for Buddy" - 2:50
 "The Opener" - 3:02
 "Fearless Finlay" - 3:05
 "Theme and Variations" - 2:45
 "Kingfish" - 3:08
 "In Lighter Vein" - 2:42
 "Of All Things" - 3:18 Bonus track on CD reissue
 "Lover Man" (Jimmy Davis, Ram Ramirez, Jimmy Sherman) - 4:21 Bonus track on CD reissue
 "My Funny Valentine" (Richard Rodgers, Lorenz Hart) - 3:17 Bonus track on CD reissue
 "Bags" [alternate take] - 2:32 Bonus track on CD reissue
Recorded at Capitol Recording Studios in Hollywood, CA on March 1, 1954 (tracks 14 & 16-19), March 2, 1954 (tracks 1, 4, 8, 10-13 & 15) and March 3, 1954 (tracks 2, 3, 5-7, 9 & 20).

Personnel
Stan Kenton - piano, conductor
Buddy Childers - trumpet
Vic Minichiello - trumpet
Sam Noto - trumpet
Don Smith - trumpet
Stu Williamson - trumpet
Joe Giavardone - trombone  
Milt Gold - trombone
Bob Fitzpatrick, Frank Rosolino - trombone
George Roberts - bass trombone 
Charlie Mariano - alto saxophone
Dave Schildkraut - alto saxophone
Mike Cicchetti - tenor saxophone
Bill Perkins - tenor saxophone
Tony Ferina - baritone saxophone 
Bob Lesher - guitar
Don Bagley - bass
Stan Levey - drums
Candido Camero - bongos, congas (tracks 4 & 10)

References

Stan Kenton albums
1954 albums
Capitol Records albums
Albums arranged by Bill Russo
Albums conducted by Stan Kenton
Albums produced by Lee Gillette